The Soil Association is a British registered charity. The organisation activities include campaigning – against intensive farming, for local purchasing and public education on nutrition – and certification of organic foods. It was established in 1946.

History 

Lady Eve Balfour, Friend Sykes and George Scott Williamson organized a founders' meeting for the Soil Association on 12 June 1945; about a hundred people attended. The association was formally registered on 3 May 1946, and in the next decade grew from a few hundred to over four thousand members.

The organization was formed following the publication of Balfour’s book 'The Living Soil'. Reprinted numerous times, it became a founding text of the emerging organic food and farming movement and of the Soil Association. The book is based on the initial findings of the first three years of the Haughley Experiment, the first formal, side-by-side farm trial to compare organic and chemical-based farming. 

The Haughley experiment was based on an idea that farmers were over-reliant on fertilizers, that livestock, crops and the soil should be treated as a whole system and that "natural" farming produced food which was in some way more wholesome than food produced with more intensive methods". Lady Balfour believed that mankind's future and human health were dependent on how the soil was treated, and ran the experiment to generate scientific data that would support these beliefs.

It was also founded in part due to concerns over intensive agriculture and in particular the use of herbicides. 
British Union of Fascists member Jorian Jenks, who was closely associated with Oswald Mosley, was one of the founders. Following Jenks' death in 1963, the association tilted towards the left of the political spectrum, especially under the new president, Barry Commoner. Campaigner Alastair Sawday was vice-chairman of the association between 2005 and 2007.

The association was one of the five bodies which in Versailles in 1972 formed the International Federation of Organic Agriculture Movements to act as the umbrella organisation to advocate for organic farming.

Helen Browning is the chief executive; broadcaster Monty Don was president from 2008 to 2016. Honorary vice-presidents include Jonathan Dimbleby, George McRobie, and Charlotte Mitchell; and The Prince of Wales is a royal patron.

Certification 

The association certifies organic products in farming, food processing, restaurants and catering, fisheries, textiles and leather, and health and beauty products. Its subsidiary Soil Association Certification Ltd is approved by the Department for Environment, Food and Rural Affairs. It sets standards for packaging, animal welfare, wildlife conservation, residues and additives. Since 2008 its standards have excluded nanomaterials.

See also

 Rolf Gardiner
 Claire Loewenfeld
 H. J. Massingham
 Innes Hope Pearse, founder member
 Craig Sams
 E. F. Schumacher
 Tracy Worcester
 Lizzie Vann
Living Soil Association of Tasmania
Australian Organic Farming and Gardening Society

References

Further reading

 (provides useful overview and commentary on the book's contents).

 Google books preview (Report contains submission from the Soil Association, p. 197)
 ebook

External links
 
 Profile- Soil Association Certification.

Video clips
 Soil Association YouTube channel
 Patrick Holden, ex-Director of Soil Association, presents Week In, Week Out for BBC Wales examining the implications of a carbon constrained world on agriculture

Organic farming organizations
Organic farming in the United Kingdom
Organizations established in 1946
Organisations based in Bristol
1946 establishments in the United Kingdom
Agricultural organisations based in the United Kingdom